Alexandru Săvulescu (8 January 1898 – 11 December 1961) was a Romanian football manager who coached Romania in the 1938 FIFA World Cup.

References

1898 births
1961 deaths
Romanian football managers
Romania national football team managers
1938 FIFA World Cup managers
People from Roman, Romania